Brian Eric Phelps (born 21 April 1944) is an English former diver and convicted sex offender.

Diving career
He won the gold medal in the 10 metre platform at the 1958 European Championships in Budapest, Hungary, at the age of 14 and again in 1962 at age 18. 
He competed in the 1960 Summer Olympics in Rome at the age of 16, where he took bronze in the 10 metre platform event. He was also won four gold medals at the Commonwealth, with double gold in the 1962 and 1966 games on the 10 metre platform and the 3 metre springboard events.

Phelps then went on to found the OLGA trampoline club along with his wife, Monica Rutherford, an Olympic artistic gymnast. The club, based in the South of England, has generated many international performers since its opening. These include current coach Nigel Rendell whose son, Luke Rendell, is a current international performer and Tom and Hannah Lewis, both of whom have won major titles, Hannah's being the 2003 European championships with Tom's the 2005 World Age Championship win. Brian Camp, one of Phelps's main prodigies performs regularly with the world's best. Another club member has been Claire Wright. Other OLGA performers include Danielle Pietruszka, Melissa Eryilmaz and Katy Ianson.

Phelps is now retired and before his imprisonment was living in France. He is a former commentator on diving for the Eurosport television channel.

Indecent assault and indecency case

Phelps was remanded in custody at Bournemouth Magistrates' Court in January 2008 after being charged with rape, attempted rape and 19 indecent assaults on two girls. The attacks plus 19 indecent assaults took place from 1976 to 1986 – while the girls were between six and 15.

Before Bournemouth magistrates on 6 February 2008, he was further charged with six counts of indecently assaulting a girl under 14 and one count of gross indecency, these offences being alleged to have taken place between 1975 and 1980. He next appeared at the Crown Court in Bournemouth on 25 March.

At his trial Phelps admitted to 42 charges of indecent assault and indecency. He was sentenced to 9 years imprisonment, and served 6 years in prison before being released on licence. He will be on the sex offenders register for life.

In 2023, it was claimed that there were at least 12 further victims.

References 

1944 births
Living people
English male divers
Commonwealth Games gold medallists for England
Commonwealth Games silver medallists for England
Olympic divers of Great Britain
Olympic bronze medallists for Great Britain
Divers at the 1960 Summer Olympics
Divers at the 1964 Summer Olympics
Divers at the 1962 British Empire and Commonwealth Games
Divers at the 1966 British Empire and Commonwealth Games
Olympic medalists in diving
Medalists at the 1960 Summer Olympics
Commonwealth Games medallists in diving
English people convicted of child sexual abuse
English people convicted of indecent assault
Medallists at the 1958 British Empire and Commonwealth Games
Medallists at the 1962 British Empire and Commonwealth Games
Medallists at the 1966 British Empire and Commonwealth Games